Charles Andrew "Andy" Doyle (born May 31, 1966) is the ninth and current Bishop of the Episcopal Diocese of Texas in The Episcopal Church. He was elected bishop co-adjutor on May 24, 2008, and was seated as Bishop of Texas on June 7, 2009.  Prior to his election as Bishop of Texas, Doyle served as Canon to the Ordinary under his predecessor, Don A. Wimberly. In February 2020, he announced that the Episcopal Diocese of Texas would start a $13 million racial reconciliation initiative. This move was praised by Presiding Bishop Michael B. Curry.

Biography 
Charles Andrew Doyle was born on May 31, 1966, in Carbondale, Illinois. His family moved to Houston, Texas, shortly thereafter. Doyle earned a bachelor of fine arts degree at the University of North Texas, Denton, in 1990, and a Master in Divinity at Virginia Theological Seminary, Alexandria, Virginia, in 1995.

In 1995, Doyle was ordained a deacon at Trinity Episcopal Church in Houston. In 1996, he was ordained a priest at Christ Episcopal Church in Temple, Texas, where he served as assistant to the rector from 1995 to 1997.  Doyle was vicar at St. Francis Episcopal Church, College Station, Texas, until 2003, when he became Canon to the Ordinary under Don A. Wimberly, VIII Bishop of Texas.

Doyle is married to JoAnne Doyle; they have two children, Caisa and Zoë. He is the author of Unabashedly Episcopalian: Proclaiming the Good News of the Episcopal Church.

See also

 List of Episcopal bishops of the United States
 Historical list of the Episcopal bishops of the United States

References

Texas Monthly Talks: C. Andrew Doyle, August, 2009 Texas Monthly
Bishop Diocesan, C. Andrew Doyle The Diocese of Texas

External links
Episcopal Diocese of Texas

1966 births
Living people
American Episcopalians
University of North Texas alumni
Virginia Theological Seminary alumni
American Episcopal priests
American religious leaders
Episcopal bishops of Texas